HR 7955 is a binary star system in the northern circumpolar constellation of Cepheus, near the constellation border with Cygnus. It has a yellow-white hue and is faintly visible to the naked eye with a combined apparent visual magnitude of 4.51. The system is located at a distance of 89 light-years (27.3 parsecs) from the Sun, based on parallax. It has a relatively high proper motion, traversing the celestial sphere at the rate of 0.243 arc seconds per annum, and is drifting closer to the Sun with a radial velocity of -33 km/s.

The double-lined nature of this spectroscopic binary system was not announced until 1972. Both components appear to be slightly evolved stars that are leaving the main sequence and becoming subgiant stars, with stellar classifications of F8IV-V and F9IV-V. They each have slightly greater mass than the Sun: 107% and 105%, respectively. The system is about 2.25 billion years old.

References

F-type main-sequence stars
F-type subgiants
Spectroscopic binaries
Cepheus (constellation)
Durchmusterung objects
9706
198084
102431
7955